Karin Prien (born 26 June 1965) is a German lawyer and politician of the Christian Democratic Union (CDU) who has been serving as State Minister of Education, Science and Culture of Schleswig-Holstein in the government of Minister-President Daniel Günther since 28 June 2017. She was previously a member of the Hamburg Parliament.

Since 2022, Prien has been one of four deputy chairs of the CDU, under the leadership of chairman Friedrich Merz.

Early life and education 
Born in Amsterdam, Prien is of Jewish origin and first grew up in the Netherlands, where her maternal grandparents had fled in the early 1930s before the emergence of National Socialism in Germany. She later moved to Germany.

After graduation (Abitur) in 1984 in Rhineland-Palatinate, Prien studied law and political science in Bonn. From 1986 to 1989, she was a student assistant of Friedbert Pflüger, then the press secretary of the Federal President Richard von Weizsäcker. She took the first Staatsexamen in 1989, which was followed by the LL.M. after postgraduate studies in Amsterdam in 1991 and the second Staatsexamen in Celle in 1994.

Early career
Since 1994, Prien has been an independent lawyer specializing in commercial and insolvency law in Hanover, Leipzig and Hamburg. Since 2008, she has been a certified lawyer for commercial and corporate law, and also a mediator since 2011.

Political career

Early beginnings
Prien became a member of the CDU in 1981. She was from 2004 to April 2012 deputy CDU local chairwoman in Blankenese, from 2006 Deputy District Chairwoman in the district association Altona-Elbvororte, and since 2010 a member of the CDU state executive committee. From January 2014 she had been local chairwoman of the CDU in Blankenese, an office she gave to Johann Riekers after her move to Schleswig-Holstein. In addition, Prien is chairwoman of the Jewish Forum of the CDU.

Member of the Hamburg Parliament, 2011-2017
As a candidate of the CDU in her constituency of Blankenese, she was elected to the Hamburg state parliament in 2011 for the first time. She was a political spokeswoman for the CDU parliamentary group and a member of the parliamentary group's leadership.

In the 2015 state election, Prien again won a direct mandate in the constituency of Blankenese with 11.5 percent of the votes. In the parliament, she was a member of the Budget Committee, the Constitution and District Committee, the School Committee and the Committee on Social Affairs, Labor and Integration. She was Deputy Group Chair and Specialist for the School and Constitution of the CDU. In the course of her change to the state government of Schleswig-Holstein, she resigned in June 2017 from the Hamburg Parliament; her parliament mandate was taken over by Wolfhard Ploog.

State Minister of Education in Schleswig-Holstein, 2017–present 
After formation of a Jamaica coalition of CDU, FDP and Greens in the wake of the 2017 Schleswig-Holstein state election, Prien was appointed Minister of Education, Science and Culture of Schleswig-Holstein on 28 June 2017 and is part of the state government of Minister-President Günther.

In the negotiations to form a fourth coalition government under Chancellor Angela Merkel following the 2017 federal elections, Prien was part of the working group on education policy, led by Annegret Kramp-Karrenbauer, Stefan Müller and Hubertus Heil.

Since 17 November 2018 Prien has been one of the four deputy chairs of the CDU Schleswig-Holstein, succeeding State Minister for Justice Sabine Sütterlin-Waack who did not run for reelection.  Prien supports the CDU-internal group "Union of the Middle,"  which is regarded as the counterpart of the conservative "value union."

Ahead of the 2021 elections, CDU chairman Armin Laschet included Prien in his eight-member shadow cabinet for the Christian Democrats' campaign.

Prien was nominated by her party as delegate to the Federal Convention for the purpose of electing the President of Germany in 2022.

Other activities
 Nordmetall Foundation, Member of the Board of Trustees (since 2018)
 Cultural Foundation of the German States (KdL), Ex-Officio Member of the Board of Trustees (since 2017)
 Schleswig-Holstein Musik Festival, Ex-Officio Member of the Board of Trustees (since 2017)
 David Ben-Gurion Foundation, Member of the Board of Trustees
 Haus Rissen, Member of the Board of Trustees
 Stiftung Lesen, Member of the Board of Trustees

Political positions
For the 2021 national elections, Prien endorsed Armin Laschet as the Christian Democrats' joint candidate to succeed Chancellor Angela Merkel.

In early 2022, Prien called for Hans-Georg Maaßen to be expelled from the CDU.

Personal life
Prien is married to lawyer Jochen Prien and has three children.

References

External links 
 Biography at the Hamburg Parliament website
 Eigene Homepage
 Karin Prien on abgeordnetenwatch.de

1965 births
20th-century German Jews
21st-century German Jews
21st-century German politicians
Christian Democratic Union of Germany politicians
Members of the Hamburg Parliament
Ministers of the Schleswig-Holstein State Government
Living people